Three Swedes in Upper Bavaria (German: Drei Schwedinnen in Oberbayern) is a 1977 West German sex comedy film directed by Sigi Rothemund and starring Gianni Garko, Alexander Grill and Beate Hasenau. It was shot in Munich and on location in the Austrian Tyrol.

Synopsis
The owner of a struggling Bavarian hotel decides to import three attractive Swedish girls to help out, and they manage to save the business.

Cast

References

Bibliography 
 Bock, Hans-Michael & Bergfelder, Tim. The Concise CineGraph. Encyclopedia of German Cinema. Berghahn Books, 2009.

External links 
 

1977 films
1970s sex comedy films
German sex comedy films
West German films
1970s German-language films
Films directed by Sigi Rothemund
Films scored by Gerhard Heinz
Films set in the Alps
Films set in Bavaria
1977 comedy films
1970s German films